Willi Brendel (6 August 1938 – 22 March 2006) was a German field hockey player. He competed in the men's tournament at the 1960 Summer Olympics.

References

External links
 

1938 births
2006 deaths
German male field hockey players
Olympic field hockey players of the United Team of Germany
Field hockey players at the 1960 Summer Olympics
People from Kaiserslautern
Sportspeople from Rhineland-Palatinate